The 1994 WTA Tour was the elite tour for professional women's tennis organised by the Women's Tennis Association (WTA). The WTA Tour includes the four Grand Slam tournaments, the year-ending WTA Tour Championships and the WTA Tier I, Tier II, Tier III and Tier IV events. ITF tournaments are not part of the WTA Tour, although they award points for the WTA World Ranking.

Schedule
The table below shows the 1994 WTA Tour schedule.

Key

January

February

March

April

May

June

July

August

September

October

November

Rankings
Below are the 1994 WTA year-end rankings in both singles and doubles competition:

Statistical information

List of players and titles won, last name alphabetically:
Arantxa Sánchez Vicario – Amelia Island, Barcelona, Hamburg, French Open, Montreal, US Open, Tokyo (Tier II), Oakland (8)
Steffi Graf – Australian Open, Tokyo (Tier I), Indian Wells, Delray Beach, Miami, Berlin, San Diego (7)
Conchita Martínez – Hilton Head, Rome, Wimbledon, Stratton Mountain (4)
Anke Huber – Styria, Filderstadt, Philadelphia (3)
Jana Novotná – Leipzig, Brighton, Essen (3)
Sabine Appelmans – Linz, Pattaya City (2)
Yayuk Basuki – Osaka, Jakarta (2)
Kimiko Date – Sydney, Tokyo (Tier III) (2)
Lindsay Davenport – Brisbane, Lucerne (2)
Magdalena Maleeva – Moscow, Zurich (2)
Meredith McGrath – Oklahoma City, Eastbourne (2)
Amanda Coetzer – Prague (1)
Mana Endo – Hobart (1)
Mary Joe Fernández – Strasbourg (1)
Amy Frazier – Manhattan Beach (1)
Sabine Hack – Houston (1)
Julie Halard – Taranto (1)
Ginger Helgeson – Auckland (1)
Katerina Maleeva – Quebec City (1)
Manuela Maleeva-Fragniere – Osaka (1)
Lori McNeil – Birmingham (1)
Martina Navratilova – Paris (1)
Elena Pampoulova – Surabaya (1)
Gabriela Sabatini – WTA Tour Championships (1)
Naoko Sawamatsu – Singapore (1)
Irina Spîrlea – Palermo (1)
Wang Shi-ting – Taipei (1)
Judith Wiesner – Schenectady (1)
Natalia Zvereva – Chicago (1)

The following players won their first title:
 Mana Endo
 Ginger Helgeson
 Meredith McGrath
 Irina Spîrlea
 Elena Pampoulova

See also
 1994 ATP Tour

References

External links
1994 Tournament Archive. WTA Tour.

 
WTA Tour
1994 WTA Tour